The 1865 South Carolina gubernatorial election was held on October 18, to elect the governor of South Carolina. It was the first gubernatorial election in which the voters of South Carolina were able to directly choose the Governor as a result of the ratification of the South Carolina Constitution of 1865. However, the constitution only permitted for white males to cast ballots and blacks were forbidden from voting.

General election
The general election was held on October 18, 1865 and James Lawrence Orr was elected as the first postbellum governor of South Carolina. He won a narrow victory over Wade Hampton who campaigned for his supporters not to vote for him. Neither candidate was aligned with any political party for the election.

County results

See also
Governor of South Carolina
List of governors of South Carolina
South Carolina gubernatorial elections

References

External links
SCIway Biography of Governor James Lawrence Orr
SCIway Biography of Governor Wade Hampton III

1865 United States gubernatorial elections
1865
Gubernatorial
October 1865 events